La Petite-Patrie is a neighbourhood of Montreal, Quebec, Canada. It is located in the borough of Rosemont–La Petite-Patrie.

The area is bounded on the west by Hutchison Street, to the north by Jean Talon Street, to the south by the Canadian Pacific Railway tracks, and to the east by d'Iberville Street.

La Petite-Patrie is named after the novel La Petite Patrie by Claude Jasmin, which was published in 1972 and was adapted into television series (La Petite Patrie) shortly afterward.

Originally a working-class neighbourhood, La Petite-Patrie began to gentrify in the early 21st century.

History
Until the late 19th century, La Petite-Patrie was mainly agricultural, with the exception of limestone quarries, now the location of Père Marquette Park.

The construction of a tramway in 1892 linking downtown to Sault-au-Récollet led to the urbanization of the area, which continued until about 1930. It was still a predominantly-residential neighborhood since the only employment was concentrated along the railway, in the workshops of Montreal, or in the Montreal Street Railway.

Demographics
A report by the Centre de santé et de services sociaux (CSSS) du Cœur-de-l'île, the neighborhood's population consists of:
 44% of single parent families,
 19% of immigrants (born outside of Canada)
 10% unemployed,
 36% of people living below the poverty line

The area includes several ethnic communities, including an Italian community, a Vietnamese community and a Latin American community.

Transport

Roads
The main roads in La Petite-Patrie include (street directions according to street grid, not geographical):

 North-South:
 Park Avenue
 Saint-Laurent Boulevard
 Saint-Denis Street
 Saint-Hubert Street
 Christophe-Colomb Avenue
 Papineau Avenue
 De Lorimier Avenue
 East-West
 Rosemont Boulevard
 Bellechasse Street
 Beaubien Street
 Saint-Zotique Street 
 Bélanger Street
 Jean-Talon Street

Public transit
The orange line of the Montreal Metro crosses the neighbourhood
Rosemont Station
Beaubien Station
Jean-Talon Station

Bicycle paths
La Petite-Patrie is crossed by various bicycle paths (street directions according to street grid, not geographical):
Along the Canadian Pacific railway line (North East - South West)
Along Saint-Dominique Street (North - South)
Along Drolet Street (North - South)
Along Boyer Street (North - South)
Along Marquette Street (North - South)
Along De la Roche Street (North - South)
Along Saint-Zotique Street (East - West)
Along Bellechasse Street (East - West)
Along De Lanaudiere Street (South)
Along Bélanger Street (East - West)

Public services

 Culture
 Théâtre Plaza
Healthcare
 CLSC de La Petite-Patrie
 Security and justice
 The Youth Division of the Court of Quebec located on Bellechasse Street.

Education

The Commission scolaire de Montréal (CSDM) operates Francophone public schools.
 École secondaire Père-Marquette

The English Montreal School Board (EMSB) operates Anglophone public schools.

The Montreal Public Libraries Network operates the La Petite-Patrie library and the Bibliothèque Marc-Favreau, which opened in December 2013.

Sports and recreation

Sports
 Centre Père-Marquette (swimming pool, gymnasium, hockey rink)
 Piscine Saint-Denis (swimming pool, on Saint-Hubert Street)
Parks
Père-Marquette Park has soccer and baseball fields, playground equipment, community gardens and a skatepark.

Economy
 Jean-Talon Market is a large public market
 La Plaza Saint-Hubert is an shopping district located on Saint-Hubert Street between Bellechasse Street and Jean Talon Street.

Places of worship

 Saint-Ambroise Church
 Saint-Édouard Church
 Saint-Arsène Church
 Saint-Jean-Berchmans Church
 Church of the Madonna della Difesa (Notre-Dame-de-la-Défense Church)

References

Neighbourhoods in Montreal
Rosemont–La Petite-Patrie
Gentrification in Canada